Breaker Bay is a suburb on the south east coast of Wellington City in New Zealand, on the Miramar Peninsula. The suburb contains a 600 m wide bay of the same name.

Geography 
Breaker Bay is a thin strip of land along the southeast coast of Miramar Peninsula. The suburb includes five bays; the largest, Breaker Bay, is at its north, with the other bays going south being Eve Bay, Flax Bay, Reef Bay, and Palmer Bay. It is part of the western shore of the Wellington Harbour entrance. 

The suburb of Breaker Bay is named after its largest bay. F. L. Irvine-Smith wrote in 1948, "South from Seatoun is Breaker Bay (by no means a misnomer) reached by the Pass of Branda, named from the well-known pass at the head of Loch Awa [sic]". The Pass of Branda forms the northern entrance to the suburb.

The area is known for southerly gales as it is exposed to Cook Strait. Waves would often crash over the road in winter, and intense storms put pressure on the coastline which is facing erosion. Storms have rendered its only road unusable and damaged, such as in 2013. In 2016, construction started on a new seawall to protect houses and the road and was expected to be finished by April 2017. Another storm in 2021 was declared a state of emergency. Around 140 homes in Breaker Bay were evacuated, the road was closed for around a day, and debris spread across the road needed to be cleared. 

The Wahine disaster, a 1968 ferry sinking in which 53 people died, occurred near Breaker Bay. The ferry ended up on Barrett Reef, a feature in the water just off of the bay. Stuart Young, a Breaker Bay resident, was the first to raise the alarm. Some residents attempted to set out in small boats to assist but were forced back by the waves. The Wahine Memorial Park in the suburb commemorates the event; the park is near where survivors reached the shore and includes a bow thruster from the ship.

The Eastern Walkway runs along the top of the bay and has views of the area.

Dolphins and orca are regularly sighted from the suburb. Penguins nest in the area and there are "penguin crossing" signs on the road.

Facilities and transport 
Breaker Bay is known for being a clothing optional beach, which is shared by naturists and clothed people alike. New Zealand has no official nude beaches, as public nudity is legal on any beach where it is "known to occur". Families tend to congregate at the end nearest to the road and pass the hole in the rock (to the middle of the beach).

Breaker Bay has only a single road, Breaker Bay Road, which runs close to the coast through the suburb. The suburb is served by a commuter bus (No 30x) running on weekdays to the city in the mornings and to the beach in the afternoons.

There are no public toilets in Breaker Bay. As of 2014, residents were pushing for the council to install toilets, saying that visitors were defecating in bushes, but the council said it had assessed the area and there was not enough demand for toilets there.

Demographics
Breaker Bay is not a statistical area for the purpose of New Zealand censuses. It mainly sits in the Seatoun statistical area, and partly in the Rongotai statistical area.

External links 

 Breaker Bay and Moa Point Progressive Association (BBMPPA)

Gallery

References

Bays of the Wellington Region
Nude beaches
Suburbs of Wellington City
Cook Strait
Beaches of the Wellington Region
Populated places around the Wellington Harbour
Naturism in New Zealand